{{DISPLAYTITLE:CH4N2S}}
The molecular formula CH4N2S (molar mass: 76.12 g/mol, exact mass: 76.0095 u) may refer to:

 Ammonium thiocyanate
 Thiourea